Little Kanawha Valley Bank is a historic bank building located at Glenville, Gilmer County, West Virginia. It was built in 1901, and is a small one story commercial building with Classical Revival-style details. It is a rectangular frame building covered in pressed sheet metal. It was occupied by the Little Kanawha Valley Bank until 1916, when they moved to larger quarters.

It was listed on the National Register of Historic Places in 1991.

References

Bank buildings on the National Register of Historic Places in West Virginia
Commercial buildings completed in 1901
Buildings and structures in Gilmer County, West Virginia
Neoclassical architecture in West Virginia
National Register of Historic Places in Gilmer County, West Virginia